Khanyar Assembly constituency is one of the 87 constituencies in the Jammu and Kashmir Legislative Assembly of Jammu and Kashmir a north state of India. Khanyar is also part of Srinagar Lok Sabha constituency.

Member of Legislative Assembly

 1962: Gazi Abdul Rehman, Jammu & Kashmir National Conference
 1967: G. Ahmed, Indian National Congress
 1972: Saif Ud Din Qari, Jamait-I-Islami
 1996:  Ali Mohammad Sagar, Jammu & Kashmir National Conference
 2002:   Ali Mohammad Sagar, Jammu & Kashmir National Conference
 2008:  Ali Mohammad Sagar, Jammu & Kashmir National Conference

Election results

2014

See also
 Khanyar
 Srinagar district
 List of constituencies of Jammu and Kashmir Legislative Assembly

References

Assembly constituencies of Jammu and Kashmir
Srinagar district